Michael Dokken (born June 4, 1971) is a retired American stock car racing driver and a former competitor in the NASCAR Craftsman Truck Series.

Career
Dokken first achieved notice in 1990, when he won the first race he ever competed in at New Smyrna Speedway. He made his NASCAR Truck Series debut in 1995 at I-70, driving his own No. 64 Chevrolet he started the race in 25th and only completed 120 laps before his engine expired and finished 21st. Dokken made six other starts in 1995, his best finish being 15th at Flemington. His best start was third at Phoenix.

In 1996, Dokken competed in 20 of the 24 races. He started off by running 13th in points after Tucson, where he scored his first career top-10 of 9th, before missing several races. He earned a 7th in one of his last races for his team at Nashville Speedway USA, and then split the last part of the schedule with MB Motorsports, and Kurt Roehrig.

In 1997, Dokken signed to drive Roehrig's No. 18 Dana Holding Corporation Dodge Ram for the full season. At Tucson, Dokken won his first career pole, becoming the series' youngest pole winner until Kurt Busch in 2000, and led 95 of 200 laps, before late race problems relegated Dokken to 13th. Later on, Dokken would earn a 3rd at Evergreen Speedway and 5th at Nazareth. However, mechanical problems plagued the team, falling out of multiple races, and the team only ran one of the last thirteen races due to limited funding.

Dokken skipped 1998, but returned for five races in 1999, splitting races between three teams. He DNF'd in every start however, with his best finish being a  27th place showing at Las Vegas.

Dokken made four more starts in 2000. where had an eighth-place run with Ware Racing Enterprises at NHIS. Dokken also finished in the top-21 in all his starts and finished all of them.

Dokken made starts in 2001, splitting time between Brevak Racing and Ware Racing. His best run was with Ware at Nazareth: an 11th-place finish. He closed 2001 with three straight top-20 finishes. Dokken also ran three Busch Series races in 2001, running for Armando Fitz. He made his debut at Pikes Peak, where he started 39th and finished 41st. He finished 42nd in his other two starts, but earned his best career start of 36th at Charlotte.

Dokken only made eight races in 2002, running with Ware, Troxell Racing, Richardson Racing, and Team Racing. He ran three races with Ware, where he had a 22nd and then a pair of 19ths. After his departure from Ware, his best run was a 32nd.

Dokken's last year was 2003, competing in six races, with Troxell, RDS Motorsports, and Team Racing. His best run was a 14th at Memphis, running the RDS truck. Dokken's final race at the series was at Gateway International Raceway in July of that year; he was injured in a practice crash the following week at Michigan International Speedway; he suffered a minor fracture to the base of the skull, and has not competed in NASCAR competition since.

Post-NASCAR 
Dokken ran a limited schedule in the Pro Cup Series in 2004, before retiring from driving and becoming a crew chief in the Craftsman Truck Series.

Motorsports career results

NASCAR
(key) (Bold – Pole position awarded by qualifying time. Italics – Pole position earned by points standings or practice time. * – Most laps led.)

Busch Series

Craftsman Truck Series

ARCA Hooters SuperCar Series
(key) (Bold – Pole position awarded by qualifying time. Italics – Pole position earned by points standings or practice time. * – Most laps led.)

References

External links
 
 

Living people
1971 births
Sportspeople from Clearwater, Florida
Racing drivers from Florida
NASCAR drivers
NASCAR crew chiefs
CARS Tour drivers
ARCA Menards Series drivers